The discography of English rock band Courteeners consists of six studio albums, four EPs, 19 singles and one DVD album. Several of the band's songs have been featured in adverts and TV shows.

Albums

Studio albums

Other albums

EPs

Singles

Other charted and certified songs

Video albums
Live at the MEN Arena (12 December 2011)

Notes

References

Alternative rock discographies
Discographies of British artists